Mark Shaw (born Mark Robert Tiplady on 10 June 1961 in Chesterfield, Derbyshire, England) is an English singer and songwriter who formed the 1980s rock band Then Jerico, which he continues to front. Their last studio album was 1998's Orgasmaphobia.

Music career
After the original Then Jerico line-up split in early 1990, Shaw went solo releasing his only studio album, Almost for EMI in 1991.

A live album, Alive & Exposed, recorded in the summer of 1992 at The Grand Theatre, Clapham, London was released by Murder Records in 2000 under the 'Mark Shaw Etc., Then Jerico' banner featuring new song "Step into the Light".
 
On 12 December 2012, via the official Then Jerico website, Shaw announced details of a 2013 "Reprise" tour consisting of 13 dates around the United Kingdom, culminating in a show at the Clapham Grand in London. The tour commenced on 7 May 2013, featuring the original line-up of the band, made up of Mark Shaw, guitarists Rob Downes and Scott Taylor, bass player Jasper Stainthorpe and drummer Steve Wren.

Shaw continues to tour with a new line-up of Then Jerico. A number of acoustic shows were scheduled to take place in 2018.

In 2022, he was part of Music 4 Ukraine's charity single "Heal This Broken Land". This was a version of "Broken Land" by Northern Irish band The Adventures, which also featured Nick Heyward, T’Pau's Carol Decker, The Christians, Nathan Moore of Brother Beyond and Doctor and The Medics.

Acting roles

In January 1994, Shaw made his acting debut as Johnny in the London production of Bad Boy Johnny and the Prophets of Doom by Daniel Abineri.

Other activities
Shaw was the special guest DJ for "The Eighties Nostalgia: Resurrection" at The Lexington in London on 27 July and appeared live on-air on the Absolute Radio Christian O'Connell Show for his 1980s "Who's Calling Christian" feature.

In 2003, Shaw appeared in the Reborn in the USA reality television series, but abruptly quit the show after just one day of filming. Shaw was interviewed by Channel 5 about his "brief but memorable" appearance on Reborn in the USA and the numerous reasons why he walked out of the show on their Most Shocking Talent Show Moments programme which aired in April 2011. He also briefly appeared on Channel 5's Most Shocking Reality TV Moments clip show in September 2014, but was not interviewed.

On 10 June 2012, Vintage TV aired a show hosted by Shaw. It aired another show hosted by him on 3 October 2012.

On 16 May 2020 Then Jerico appeared remotely on the line-up for the 80s Lockdown Fest organised by Let's Rock The Retro Festival. The event raised money for the Child Bereavement UK charity.

Discography

Albums
 Almost (EMI, 1991)
 Alive & Exposed - as Mark Shaw Etc. (Murder Records, 2000) (re-issued by Then Jerico Music in 2011)

Singles
 "Love So Bright" (EMI, 1990)
 "Under Your Spell" (EMI, 1991)

Then Jerico discography

References

External links
 Then Jerico official website

1961 births
Living people
English rock singers
English male singer-songwriters
English male stage actors
People from Chesterfield, Derbyshire
Musicians from Derbyshire